Bridel is a town in the commune of Kopstal, central Luxembourg.  , the town has a population of 2,858.

Kopstal
Towns in Luxembourg